River jam is a common name of more than one plant:

 Acacia citrinoviridis, also known as black mulga
 Acacia coriacea, also known as wirewood or wiry wattle